Acrosternum is a genus of stink bugs in the family Pentatomidae. There are more than 20 described species in Acrosternum.

Species
These 23 species belong to the genus Acrosternum:

 Acrosternum arabicum Wagner, 1959
 Acrosternum aseadum Rolston
 Acrosternum bellum Rolston
 Acrosternum brasicola Rolston
 Acrosternum breviceps Jakovlev, 1889
 Acrosternum callosum Rolston
 Acrosternum collis Rolston
 Acrosternum cubensis Rider
 Acrosternum ecuadorensis Rolston
 Acrosternum elegans Bruner & Barber
 Acrosternum froeschneri Rolston
 Acrosternum gramineum
 Acrosternum heegeri Fieber, 1861
 Acrosternum hilare (Say, 1832)
 Acrosternum malickyi Josifov & Heiss, 1989
 Acrosternum marginatum (Palisot, 1811)
 Acrosternum miliare Klug, 1845
 Acrosternum millierei (Mulsant & Rey, 1866)
 Acrosternum pensylvanicum (Gmelin, 1790)
 Acrosternum rubescens (Noualhier, 1893)
 Acrosternum solitum Rider & Rolston
 Acrosternum triangulum Rider & Rolston
 Acrosternum wygodzinskyi Rolston

References

Further reading

External links

 

Pentatomidae genera
Pentatominae